Mawr is a community (and former electoral ward) of the City and County of Swansea, in south Wales, U.K.  Mawr has its own elected community council. Its name simply means "large", and it was given the name because it was the largest piece of land in the former parish of Llangyfelach.

Description
Mawr falls within the parliamentary constituency of Gower. It is bounded by the communities of Pontarddulais to the west; Llangyfelach and Morriston to the south; Clydach to the southeast; Pontardawe of Neath Port Talbot to the northeast; Betws to the north and Tycroes to the north west. For the purposes of community elections it is broken down into three polling districts: Garnswllt, Craigcefnparc and Felindre.  

Mawr consists of some or all of the following villages: Felindre, Bryntwood, Craigcefnparc, Garnswllt, Rhydypandy and rural uplands of Mawr. The ward is one of the most sparsely populated in Swansea, and it has the highest proportion of Welsh language speakers (38% of those over three years old at the 2011 census). Mawr was the second largest ward in Swansea by land area, and the largest community.  Most of the community consists of rural farmland and open moorland.

Local government
Mawr elects a community council of 12 members (with one vacancy in 2016), though in 2015 the council was found to be performing its duties inadequately and not addressing the problems identified in a 2011 report.

2022 boundary changes
Until 2022 Mawr was an electoral ward to Swansea Council. Following a local government ward boundary review, at the 2022 local elections the Mawr ward ceased to exist, with the area absorbed into the neighbouring wards  of Clydach, Llangyfelach and Pontarddulais.

2012 local council elections
In the 2012 local council elections, the voter turnout for Mawr was 44.82%. The results were:

Lliw Reservoirs country park
There are two man-made reservoirs near the village of Felindre, in the Lliw valley, called the Lower Lliw Reservoir and the Upper Lliw Reservoir. The reservoirs are managed by Welsh Water. The surrounding countryside is open to the public for recreational purposes.

The Lower Lliw Reservoir (or Felindre Reservoir) was originally opened in 1863 to provide water for Swansea and the surrounding area; it cost £160,000 to create. The Upper Lliw Reservoir opened in 1892 and cost £116,000 to build. The Lower Lliw Reservoir was reconstructed between 1976 and 1978, including a new rockfill dam, new overflow spillway and new pumping station.

References

External links
Ward info for Mawr
Mawr Development Trust

Communities in Swansea
Former electoral wards of Swansea